Bladestorm may refer to:

Bladestorm: The Hundred Years' War, a video game
 1987 Mogul Communications retitling of the 1966 film Knives of the Avenger